Rainier Beach is a set of neighborhoods in Seattle, Washington that are mostly residential.  Also called Atlantic City, Rainier Beach can include Dunlap, Pritchard Island, and Rainier View neighborhoods.

The neighborhood is located in the far southeastern corner of the city along Lake Washington. Its primary arterials are Rainier and Renton Avenues South (northwest- and southeast-bound).

Neighborhood boundaries are informal and sometimes overlapping in Seattle; formal designations have not existed since 1910.  Rainier Beach blends with the Rainier Valley neighborhood of Dunlap (also called Othello) on the north.  On the east is Lake Washington, and the South Beacon Hill neighborhood lies to the west.  South of Rainier Beach is Rainier View, bounded by South Bangor Street on the north and the city boundary on its south, east, and west. The Lakeridge and Skyway neighborhoods of unincorporated King County lie to the southeast and southwest, respectively, of Rainier View. The city of Tukwila abuts Rainier View on the west.

History 
What is now Rainier Beach neighborhood has been inhabited since the end of the last glacial period (c. 8,000 BC – 10,000 years ago).  The Xacuabš (hah-chu-ahbsh, Lake People or People of the Large Lake) were related to, but distinct from, the Dkhw'Duw'Absh, People of the Inside, tribe of the Lushootseed (Skagit-Nisqually) Coast Salish Nations.  Both are now (c. mid-1850s) of the Duwamish tribe.  The Xacuabš village of tleelh-chus (little island) was, appropriately, on an island at the southwest shore of what is now called Lake Washington, at their trail through a valley that led to the villages of the Dkhw'Duw'Absh on salt water at Elliott Bay and the estuarial Duwamish River.  The Duwamish were dispossessed with the Treaty of Point Elliott of 1855.  The trail became the route for driving livestock to the town of Seattle (1870s), the valley was renamed Rainier Valley, the island was renamed Young's Island (1883), then Pritchard Island (1900), the trail became the route of the Seattle and Rainier Beach Railway (1894), then the Seattle, Renton and Southern; the route became that of Rainier Avenue S (1937), the main road to Renton and on over Snoqualmie Pass until the then-innovative floating bridge of 1940 was opened at the nearby Mount Baker neighborhood.

An electric trolley line came to Rainier Valley in 1891, to Columbia City; to Renton in 1896.  Residential development began in earnest.  An early sharp operator (beginning in 1896), Clarence Dayton Hillman, namesake of the nearby Hillman City neighborhood, designated Rainier Beach as the Atlantic City residential development (1905) after the New Jersey resort.  He included a park area on the cove, built a pier, bath house, boat house, picnic facilities—and sold the land to multiple buyers when he got around to platting the properties snapped up by eager buyers attracted by the adjacent amenities, as well as allowing multiple street naming rights.  The tangled street names were sorted out, the property was eventually returned to park purposes (c. 1912) and the park name has stuck.  (Hillman was eventually caught and nominally convicted.)  The interurban railway remained until 1936, when it was torn up to make way for automobiles.

Of historic buildings, at least two survive.  Emerson School (1909), Lakeridge, is an historic landmark, sitting on a hill over Rainier Beach. Emerson is nearly identical to Hawthorne and Greenwood schools, built at the same time. All are brick in Jacobean style.  The first public Kindergarten in Seattle opened in 1914 at Emerson School.  A notable Emerson graduate was professional baseball player and manager Fred Hutchinson (1919–1964), remembered today with the Fred Hutchinson Cancer Research Center.  Seattle Fire Department Firehouse #33 (1914), is a historic landmark, built for a single horse-drawn fire engine. The modified Tudor style was fitted architecturally into the Lakeridge neighborhood (also known as Rainier View).  The hose tower was built into the ground rather than built above the roof line.  For the horses (1914–1924), the floor of the single equipment bay was sloped to reduce the starting jolt in responding to a fire alarm.

Rainier Beach joined Seattle by annexation in 1907. Post World War II, the area became urban. With a sewer outfall near the beaches of Atlantic City Park and dramatic collapses in water quality in the 1950s, the neighborhood benefited greatly with the Metro cleanup of Lake Washington in the 1960s. The African-American population has been slowly increasing in the neighborhood due in large part to the gentrification in other Seattle neighborhoods that has forced many Blacks to move either into the South end of the city or into the south King County suburbs. Today Rainier Beach has a population of 6,006 and is roughly 55% African American, 20% Asian, 10% Caucasian, 10% Hispanic and 5% from other races. It is now one of only two neighborhoods (the other being the southern end of the Central District) in the city where Blacks make up a majority. On November 25, 2014, the neighborhood became the site of several protests following the decision in Ferguson, Missouri not to indict police officer Darren Wilson over the killing of Michael Brown.

Public places and spaces 
Rainier Beach has Be'ersheva Park (Atlantic City Park 1934–1978) and the Atlantic City Boat Ramp, Kubota Garden Park, Lakeridge Park, Fred Hutchinson Playground, and Deadhorse Canyon Natural Area.  Too steep for houses in the 19th century, Lakeridge Park preserves 35.8 acres (14.2 ha) of Taylor Creek and Deadhorse Canyon.  Urban green spaces and restored natural places can not long survive the intense impact of urban life  without due care and community stewardship.  Neighborhood groups  of citizen stewards of Rainier Beach creeks and woods provide public education and volunteer effort, together with the City Department of Neighborhoods and the Parks and Recreation Department.

Mapes Creek flows from a ridge in Rainier Beach through Kubota Garden Historical Landmark (1981) and Be'ersheva Park (formerly Atlantic City Park 1907–1977) to Lake Washington. The creek was largely spared the assault of urban development by the relative remoteness of its watershed through the frenzied boom development decades 1850–1910 and the efforts of the business of Master Gardener Fujitaro Kubota from 1927, interrupted by World War II Japanese American Internment, until his death in 1973. Fortuitous efforts of the Kubota family had continued to leave it relatively protected until environmental protection blossomed in the later 20th century. The garden is now maintained by the gardeners of the city Parks and Recreation department and by volunteers, largely from surrounding neighborhoods. The non-profit Kubota Garden Foundation (1990) provides stewardship to enhance and perpetuate the garden within the spirit and vision of its founder, in turn promoting understanding of Japanese gardening and philosophy in a uniquely syncretic Pacific Northwest Japanese American aesthetic.

Taylor Creek flows from Deadhorse Canyon (west of Rainier Avenue S at 68th Avenue S and northwest of Skyway Park), through Lakeridge Park to Lake Washington.  With volunteer effort and some city matching grants, restoration has been underway since 1971.  Volunteers have planted thousands of indigenous trees and plants, removed tons of garbage, removed invasive plants, and had city help removing fish-blocking culverts and improving trails.  Viable, daylighted streams can exist only in intimate connection with restoration and stewardship by the neighborhoods of their watersheds in a long run, since the good health of an urban stream could not long survive carelessness or neglect.  With impervious surfaces having replaced most of the natural ground cover in urban environments, both the sheer volume and flow rate from unmoderated stormwater and the carrying of non-point pollution converge through urban creeks.  Effective solutions include the entire urban watershed, far beyond the riparian channel itself.  A deer has been spotted and sightings of raccoon, opossum and birds are common.  By about 2050, the area will be looking like a young version of what it looked like before being disrupted.  Taylor is one of the four largest streams in urban Seattle. In 2010, the city of Seattle began a project to improve fish passage on the creek.

Schools located in the area include Rainier Beach High School and South Shore School.

Transit

Rainier Beach has a Sound Transit Link light rail station, the Rainier Beach Station. To the north, this station connects Rainier Beach to Downtown Seattle, Capitol Hill, and the University of Washington. The Rainier Beach Station also provides service to the south, to the Seattle Tacoma International Airport.
King County Metro also serves the Rainier Beach area:

Notes and references

Bibliography 

 
See heading, "Note about limitations of these data".
   **Page links to Village Descriptions Duwamish-Seattle section.
Dailey referenced "Puget Sound Geography" by T. T. Waterman.  Washington DC:  National Anthropological Archives, mss. [n.d.] [ref. 2]; **Duwamish et al. vs. United States of America, F-275.  Washington DC: US Court of Claims, 1927. [ref. 5];
"Indian Lake Washington" by David Buerge in the Seattle Weekly, 1–7 August 1984 [ref. 8];
"Seattle Before Seattle" by David Buerge in the Seattle Weekly, 17–23 December 1980. [ref. 9];
The Puyallup-Nisqually by Marian W. Smith.  New York: Columbia University Press, 1940. [ref. 10].  **Recommended start is "Coast Salish Villages of Puget Sound"
 
 
 
Rainier Beach and View maps NN-1330S and NN-1330S.Jpg [sic] dated 2002-06-13
 
  
 
 
 
 
 
 
 
High-Resolution Version, PDF format, 16.1 MB
Medium-Resolution Version, PDF format, 1.45 MB  12 January 2004.
Low-Resolution Version, PDF format, 825 KB  12 January 2004.
"Planned Arterials Map Legend Definitions", PDF format.  12 January 2004.
The high resolution version is good for printing, 11 x 17. The low and medium resolution versions are good for quicker online viewing. [Source: "Street Classification Maps, Note on Accessing These PDF Files"]
 
 
 
[No sources cited; Department of Neighborhoods, Landmarks Preservation Board, Seattle Landmarks, Fire Station #33  links to this page.]
 
Wilam referenced an extensize list.  [This article used only interurban railway information.]
 
Wilma referenced Don Sherwood, "Atlantic City Park", Interpretive Essays on the History of Seattle Parks, Handwritten bound manuscript dated 1977, Seattle Room, Seattle Public Library;
Don Sherwood, "Beer Sheva Park", Ibid.;
David Buerge, "The Native American Presence in the Rainier Valley Area", typescript, undated, Rainier Valley Historical Society, Seattle;
David Buerge, "Indian Lake Washington", The Weekly, August 1-August 7, 1984, pp. 29–33;
Lucille McDonald, "Old-Timers of Rainier Beach Area", The Seattle Sunday Times, January 1, 1956, Magazine, 8;
Lucile McDonald, "Early Developments In Southeast Seattle", Ibid., January 15, 1956, 8;
Mark Higgins, "Diverse Population Makes for a Unique Feel", Seattle Post-Intelligencer, June 7, 1997, (www.seattlep-i.nwsource.com);
Mark Higgins, "Off The Beaten Path, Rejuvenation Takes Shape", Ibid.;
Mark Higgins, "Residents Unhappy With Focus On Negative", Ibid.;
Walt Crowley, National Trust Guide: Seattle, (New York: Preservation Press, 1998), 218-221;
"Rainier Beach Library: Our History", Seattle Public Library Website, (www.spl.lib.wa.us);
Paul Dorpat, "Rainier Beach Station", Seattle Now and Then, Vol. III (Seattle: Tartu Publications, 1992).
 
Wilma referenced Richard Berner, Seattle 1900-1920: From Boomtown, Urban Turbulence, to Restoration (Seattle: Charles Press), 191;
"Seattle Will Stand By Old City Charter", The Seattle Daily Times, July 1, 1914, p. 1, 2;
"Charter Attacked By Dr. Matthews", Seattle Post-Intelligencer, June 22, 1914, p. 2.

External links
Rainier Beach, Seattle, WA on Google Maps
Rainier Beach - Thumbnail History, HistoryLink.org
Rainier Beach Community Center, Seattle Parks & Recreation
Rainier Beach Community Empowerment Coalition
Seattle City Clerk's Neighborhood Map Atlas — Rainier Beach

 
Rainier Valley, Seattle